The Australia national korfball team is managed by Korfball Australia (KA), representing Australia in international korfball competitions, including the Asia-Oceania Korfball Championship, the IKF World Korfball Championship and The World Games.

Tournament history

Current squad
National team in the 2018 Asia-Oceania Korfball Championship

 Jessica May
 Bethan Channing
 Grace Cullen
 Emily Hutchesson
 Georgia Bungey
 Joshua Berney 
 Joshua Prasad 
 Andrew Hutchesson
 Nik Bungey
 Zac Marshall
 Ben Wallace
 Coach: Phil Sibbons

References

External links
 Korfball Australia

National korfball teams
Korfball
Korfball in Australia